The 1951 Kilkenny Senior Hurling Championship was the 57th staging of the Kilkenny Senior Hurling Championship since its establishment by the Kilkenny County Board.

On 4 November 1951, Carrickshock won the championship after a 5–06 to 4–05 defeat of Tullaroan in the final. It was their seventh championship title overall and their first title since 1943. It remains their last championship triumph.

Results

Final

References

Kilkenny Senior Hurling Championship
Kilkenny Senior Hurling Championship